Clemon James Johnson Jr. (born September 12, 1956) is an American retired professional basketball player and the former head basketball coach at Florida A&M. Johnson was a 6'10",  center who played 761 games for four teams during his 10 seasons in the National Basketball Association. From 1974 to 1978 he played college basketball at Florida A&M University where he earned a bachelor's degree in economics and a master's degree in sports management.

Johnson was selected with the 22nd pick of the second round of the 1978 NBA draft by the Portland Trail Blazers. He won an NBA title with the Philadelphia 76ers in 1982–83. After his NBA playing days ended in 1988, Johnson extended his career overseas in Italy.

After his professional basketball career, Johnson became an economics teacher and high school basketball coach in Tallahassee, Florida. His son Chad played college basketball at the University of Pittsburgh until 2002.

In May 2007, Clemon Johnson was named interim head coach of the University of Alaska Fairbanks Nanooks men's basketball team. He served as interim head coach in 2007–08 and was named head coach following that season. He has coached the team for four total seasons (2007–08, 2008–09, 2009–10 and 2010–11). On May 6, 2011, Johnson was named head coach at his alma mater, Florida A&M. After three seasons and a 32–64 record, Johnson was fired from Florida A&M by athletic director Kellen Winslow.

Head coaching record

References

External links

1956 births
Living people
African-American basketball coaches
African-American basketball players
Alaska Nanooks men's basketball coaches
American expatriate basketball people in Italy
American men's basketball players
Basketball coaches from Florida
Basketball players from Florida
Centers (basketball)
Florida A&M Rattlers basketball coaches
Florida A&M Rattlers basketball players
Indiana Pacers players
Montecatiniterme Basketball players
People from Monticello, Florida
Philadelphia 76ers players
Portland Trail Blazers draft picks
Portland Trail Blazers players
Seattle SuperSonics players
Virtus Bologna players
21st-century African-American people
20th-century African-American sportspeople